Danny Bird (born 16 November 1979) is a former motorcycle speedway rider from England.

Speedway career
He rode in the top tier of British Speedway, riding for the Reading Racers during the 2007 Elite League speedway season. He began his British career riding for Isle of Wight Islanders in 1998, and reached the final of three consecutive British Speedway Championships in 2002, 2003 and 2004. His career came to a controversial ending after being banned following testing positive for drugs, which forced him to retire.

References 

1979 births
Living people
British speedway riders
Isle of Wight Islanders riders
Reading Racers riders